The Burlington Downtown Historic District is a  historic district located in Burlington, Wisconsin. It was added to the National Register of Historic Places in 2000.

It includes 80 contributing buildings and 17 non-contributing ones, as well as a non-contributing site.  Included are:
Plaza Theater (1928), at 448 Milwaukee Ave., castle-like Tudor Revival style
Jones Block 1 (1868), at 113-129 E. Chestnut St.

References

Geography of Racine County, Wisconsin
Historic districts on the National Register of Historic Places in Wisconsin
National Register of Historic Places in Racine County, Wisconsin